Hinode Dam  is an earthfill dam located in Hokkaido Prefecture in Japan. The dam is used for irrigation. The catchment area of the dam is 3.6 km2. The dam impounds about 13  ha of land when full and can store 445 thousand cubic meters of water. The construction of the dam was started on 1970 and completed in 1982.

References

Dams in Hokkaido